Takedown or take down may refer to:

Books
 Takedown: The Pursuit and Capture of America's Most Wanted Computer Outlaw, by John Markoff and Tsutomu Shimomura
 The Takedown: A Suburban Mom, a Coal Miner's Son, and the Unlikely Demise of Colombia's Brutal Norte Valle Cartel, by Jeffrey Robinson

Film and television

Film 
 Take Down (1979 film), about a high school wrestling team
 Track Down, a 2000 film known as Takedown outside the U.S., based on the book titled Takedown
 Takedown (2010 film), also known as Transparency
 Take Down (2016 film), also known as Billionaire Ransom
 The Takedown, 2022 film

TV 
 "Takedown", a Rookie Blue TV series episode

Legislation
 Notice and take down, a process operated by online hosts in response to court orders
 Words taken down, an objection to speech in the United States House of Representatives

Video games
 Takedown: Red Sabre
 Bad Boys: Miami Takedown
 Burnout 3: Takedown

Other uses
 Takedown (grappling), a martial arts technique
 Takedown gun, a rifle or shotgun designed for easy disassembly
 Colostomy takedown, a surgical procedure

See also
 Right to be forgotten